The .224 Weatherby Magnum (5.56×49mmB) is a sporting cartridge that was developed in 1963 by Roy Weatherby after about 10 years of development. It is a proprietary cartridge with no major firearms manufacturers chambering rifles for it other than Weatherby.  It was originally called the .224 Weatherby Varmintmaster when it was introduced alongside the Weatherby Varmintmaster rifle, but the rifle was discontinued in 1994 and the cartridge was renamed.

Design 
The cartridge design began years earlier but its introduction was delayed, at least in part, because of the unavailability of a suitable action. An earlier high-velocity .22 caliber round from Weatherby called the .220 Weatherby Rocket was based on the .220 Swift though it was unsuccessful and never manufactured.

For more than 50 years, it was the only Weatherby cartridge to have an angled shoulder instead of the curved, double-radius shoulder found on other Weatherby cartridges. This changed in 2019 with the introduction of the RPM (Rebated Precision Magnum) family, which launched with the 6.5 Weatherby RPM and was followed in 2022 by the .338 Weatherby RPM. Both RPM cartridges have angled shoulders and, in a first for the company, a beltless design.

Performance 
Performance is similar to the popular .22-250 and the lesser used .225 Winchester putting it in between the .220 Swift and .223 Remington cartridges. Possibly because of the similar performance and popularity of the .22-250, this round has never gotten a very large following. Costs for ammunition and rifles for this round also tend to be much more expensive.

Sporting use 

.22 caliber rifles are legal in some areas for big game up to the size of deer or larger. Convention holds the .224 Weatherby and similar cartridges are better suited to long-range varminting. Similar statements are made concerning other "big" 22 caliber cartridges like the .220 Swift and .223 WSSM.

Currently many states in the United States do allow 22 caliber rifles on big game, but the majority require a minimum of 6mm. Well known firearms author P.O. Ackley believed that fast 22 caliber cartridges were suitable for medium-large game. Craig Boddington has said that such cartridges are suitable for smaller deer. Bullets suited for hunting big-game are available from major manufacturers such as Nosler and Barnes.

See also
 5 mm caliber, other cartridges of 5–6 mm (.200–.236 in) caliber.
 List of rifle cartridges
 Table of handgun and rifle cartridges

References

External links
Weatherby official site

Pistol and rifle cartridges
Magnum rifle cartridges
Weatherby Magnum rifle cartridges